Jane Haley MBE is a British electrophysiologist who is the Edinburgh Neuroscience Scientific Coordinator at the University of Edinburgh. It was for this role in public engagement and collaboration that Haley was appointed MBE in the 2019 Queen's Birthday Honours List recognising her contribution to science engagement and education.

Education 
Haley studied Pharmacology BSc (Hons) at University College London (UCL). She graduated in 1987 at the Royal Albert Hall, where Princess Anne presided over the graduation ceremony.

Haley studied her PhD, also in Pharmacology at UCL between 1987 and 1991.

Career 
Haley's research involves understanding chronic pain and how memories are formed by measuring the electrical activity of nerve cells. She has held a post-doctoral fellowship at the University of Minnesota and Stanford University from 1991 to 1994. Haley was a post-doctoral researcher in the Department of Pharmacology at University College London from 1994 to 1999 and then at the University of Edinburgh from 2001 to 2007.

In 2006, Haley began her current role as Scientific Coordinator for Edinburgh Neuroscience at University of Edinburgh. She also currently holds a position as local group representative for the British Neuroscience Association (BNA) and sits on the ASCUS Lab Advisory Board.

Haley has also held the role of Communication Committee Member for the Federation of European Neuroscience Societies (FENS) from 2016 to 2018.

Honours and awards 
In 2012, Haley was awarded the Principal's Medal for Outstanding Service by the Principal at the University of Edinburgh.

In 2013, Haley was awarded the Award for Public Understanding of Neuroscience by the British Neuroscience Association (BNA). She was presented with this award at the BNA Christmas Symposium in London in December 2013.

In 2019, Haley was included in the Queen's Birthday Honours List to receive a Member of the Order of the British Empire (MBE). She was presented with the MBE at Buckingham Palace in January 2020 by Her Royal Highness The Princess Royal.

References

External links 
Jane Haley's Research

British scientists
British women scientists
British women neuroscientists
British neuroscientists
Living people
Alumni of University College London
Academics of the University of Edinburgh
Year of birth missing (living people)